The Diocese of Ross was an ecclesiastical territory or diocese in the Highland region of Scotland during the Middle Ages and Early modern period. The Diocese was led by the Bishop of Ross, and the cathedral was, latterly, at Fortrose. The bishops of the Early Church were located at Rosemarkie. The diocese had only one Archdeacon, the Archdeacon of Ross, first attested in 1223 with the appearance of Archdeacon Robert , who was consecrated bishop of Ross on 21 June 1249 x 20 June 1250. There is only one known Dean of Christianty (sic.) (rural dean), one Donald Reid called the dean of christianty of Dingwall on 12 June 1530.

A dean of the cathedral chapter (Henry) is first recorded in 1212 x 1213; a Subdean (William de Balvin) in 1356. A Precentor, sometimes in Scotland called Chanter, (Adam de Darlington) is attested in 1255, a Succentor (Matthew) in 1255. A Chancellor (Maurice) is attested for the first time in 1212 x 1213, a Treasurer (William) in 1227.

Following the Scottish Reformation of 1560, the Presbyterian Church of Scotland abolished the episcopacy in the diocese. The Roman Catholic Church continued to appoint bishops in communion with the Holy See.  Bishop John Lesley, however, was a post-reformation bishop who remained catholic. Episcopacy was abolished in the Church of Scotland between 1638 and 1661, when it was restored under the "Restoration Episcopate". After the Glorious Revolution of 1688, Scottish bishoprics again came under threat until in 1689 Episcopacy was permanently abolished in the established church in Scotland. From the early 18th century, the Scottish Episcopal Church appointed bishops.

In the twelfth century, the diocese is usually called "Rosemarkie", but thereafter it is called Ross. The diocese covered, roughly, the old county of Ross (also called Ross-shire).

List of parishes

Titular Catholic see Rosemarkie 
In 1973, it was nominally restored as a Catholic Titular see of the lowest (Episcopal ) rank, under the name Rosemarkie. 
It has had three incumbents

Bibliography 
 Cowan, Ian B., The Parishes of Medieval Scotland, Scottish Records Society Vol. 93, (Edinburgh, 1967)
 McNeill, Peter G.B. & MacQueen, Hector L. (eds), Atlas of Scottish History to 1707, (Edinburgh, 1996)
 Watt, D.E.R., Fasti Ecclesiae Scotinanae Medii Aevi ad annum 1638, 2nd Draft, (St Andrews, 1969)

History of the Scottish Highlands
Ross
Religion in Highland (council area)
Ross and Cromarty
Ross (Scotland)